Milford Oyster Festival, sometimes shortened to "Oysterfest," is an annual cultural festival held on the third Saturday of August throughout the city of Milford, Connecticut. As a major tourist attraction, billed as the largest one-day festival in the New England region and listed among the top 10 annual events in Connecticut, the Oyster Festival draws over 50,000 attendees each year. It is planned by the non-profit organization Annual Milford Oyster Festival, inc. (AMOF), largely run by volunteers.

The festival hosts a wide variety of activities for all ages, including arts, crafts, music, sports, amusement rides, food, and oyster shucking.

History

The first Milford Oyster Festival was held on the Milford Green and Fowler Field on 23 August 1975. Major founders of the oysterfest include Diano Nytko, first chairperson of the Milford Chamber of Commerce, and Robert N. Cooke, for whom the Bob Cooke Skin Cancer Foundation was named.

Since then the oyster festival has become firmly established as an annual Milford tradition, held rain or shine. In the past, the oysterfest was held over two days, but that proved to be too much a burden on the organizers.

While initially established as an oyster festival, the presence of actual oysters gradually faded after some time and were absent for many years outside of the festival's name. In 2005, oysters returned to the festival, provided by the East Coast Shellfish Growers Association. They have been there ever since.

Starting in 2009, Milford began requiring that the non-profit AMOF reimburse the city, which spends $30,000–50,000 to host the festival each year. As a result of this decision, AMOF could no longer allow other local non-profits to sell beer at the event, as it is a major source of income for many of the non-profits. This led Alderman Ben Blake to express concern that the festival may "lose its local flavor" as "nonprofit groups [are driven] out of the Oyster Festival food court."

In 2019 and resuming in 2021, all oysters in the festival are harvested from Milford waters, provided by Briarpatch Enterprises, Inc.

The 2020 festival was canceled due to the COVID-19 pandemic. The festival will be held as usual in 2021. Although no festival was held in the previous year, which would have been the 46th, the festival committee decided to refer to the 2021 festival the 47th Annual Milford Oyster Festival "to recognize the year that didn't occur."

Musical acts
Every festival also includes a headliner band.

Headliner by year

2021 - Southside Johnny & the Asubury Jukes
2020 – NONE
2019 — Badfish, The Cringe, Extreme
2018 — Eddie Money, John Cafferty and the Beaver Brown Band
2017 — Blackberry Smoke
2016 — Blue Öyster Cult
2015 — Gin Blossoms
2014 — Bret Michaels
2013 — Blues Traveler
2012 — Kansas 
 2011 — The Marshall Tucker Band
 2010 — Soul Asylum
 2009 — John Cafferty & The Beaver Brown Band
 2008 — Foghat
 2007 — The Smithereens
 2006 — The Spin Doctors
 2005 — Southside Johnny & the Asbury Jukes
 2004 — Blue Öyster Cult
 2003 — Marshall Tucker Band
 2002 — Voices of Classic Rock (Spencer Davis, Dave Jenkins, Larry Hoppen, Joe Lynn Turner, Ronnie Hammond, and Dennis Frederiksen)
 2001 — Mark Farner (Grand Funk Railroad), with opening act Cubistic Jack
 2000 — Joan Jett and the Blackhearts
 1999 — Starship

Fundraising
Many local and regional businesses, non-profits, and governmental groups have sponsored the event, including NBC Universal, TD Bank, and Whole Foods Market.

Money raised by AMOF during the festival has been donated for charitable purposes. In 2010, the major fundraiser of the festival was for Gulf coast fishing communities, whose oyster industries were struggling after being shut down by the BP Deepwater Horizon oil spill.

Notable participants

 Jodi Rell, the 72nd governor of Connecticut, attended the 2008 festival.
 Linda McMahon, a Republican politician, plunged a firefighter in a dunk tank in the "dunk your favorite firefighter" festival activity during her 2010 campaign for a seat in the US Senate for Connecticut.
 John A. Smith, a world-traveling sailor and writer, wrote, "It's kind of sad to hear that none of the oysters at the recent 'Oyster Festival' were from local waters and that most of the oyster boats are now in museums," in his book of travels Little Fish Big Pond while talking about Milford as his home town. (Note: In 2019 & resuming in 2021, all oysters at festival are from Milford waters.)

Surrounding events
On the Friday evening before the oysterfest, there is a surrounding event called "Oyster Eve," which includes activities such as dancing, dining, and a 90-minute cruise on an  schooner around the Long Island Sound. Around 1,500 people came to downtown Milford for Oyster Eve in 2010.

In 2010, the Daniel Street nightclub began hosting what they dubbed the "Inaugural Oyster Festival After Party" on the evening after the main events close. This year completes  years. There was no 2020 after party.

See also
 Norwalk Oyster Festival
 Oyster festival

References

External links
 Official website

Milford, Connecticut
Tourist attractions in New Haven County, Connecticut
Cultural festivals in the United States
Festivals in Connecticut
Oyster festivals